North Caucasus or North Caucasian may refer to:

Current entities
 North Caucasus, the part of Russia north of the watershed divide formed by the spine of the Caucasus Mountains.
 North Caucasian peoples
 North Caucasian languages
 North Caucasian Federal District, created in 2010 
 North Caucasus Railway, a broad gauge Russian railway network that links the Sea of Azov (in the west) and Caspian Sea
 North-Caucasus Federal University, with campuses in Stavropol and Pyatigorsk

Historical entities
 Mountainous Republic of the Northern Caucasus (1917–21)
 North Caucasian Soviet Republic (July–December 1918)
 North Caucasus Military District (1918–2010)
 North Caucasus Krai (1924–37)
 Southern Federal District created in 2000 as North Caucasian Federal District and soon renamed; the current North Caucasian Federal District was part of the Southern Federal District until 2010.

See also
 Caucasus (disambiguation)
 Caucasian (disambiguation)

Language and nationality disambiguation pages